Max Staples (born ) is an Australian male volleyball player. He is part of the Australia men's national volleyball team. On the club level he plays for VK Jihostroj České Budějovice, with this team he won the Czech Cup 2019 as well as the Extraliga 2018/2019 season.

References

External links
 Profile at FIVB.org

1994 births
Living people
Australian men's volleyball players